Conical Hill is a small but distinctive rock hill,  high, on the southern slopes of Mount Terror, above Cape MacKay, on Ross Island. It was given this descriptive name by the British Antarctic Expedition, 1910–13, under Robert Falcon Scott.

References
 

Hills of Ross Island